Nemophila parviflora, the smallflower nemophila, small-flowered nemophila or oak-leaved nemophila, is a dicot in the borage family, Boraginaceae, in the waterleaf subfamily, Hydrophylloideae.

The plant is native to the low to moderate elevation forests and chaparral and oak woodlands of western North America, from California to British Columbia and Utah.

Description
Nemophila parviflora is an annual herb that grows in the spring.

The flowers  are bowl-shaped, white to lavender, solitary from leaf axils. The corolla is up to 4.5 millimeters wide. The leaves are 10–35 mm long and 8–25 mm wide. They have 2 pairs of lateral lobes and the lobes are entire.

The fruit is a capsule with a single seed.

Varieties
Varieties include:
Nemophila parviflora var. austiniaeNemophila parviflora var. parviflora
Nemophila parviflora var. quercifolia

References

External links

Calflora Database: Nemophila parviflora (small flowered nemophila,  smallflower nemophila)
Jepson eFlora (TJM2): Nemophila maculata
 Nemophila maculata — UC Photos gallery

parviflora
Flora of the Northwestern United States
Flora of British Columbia
Flora of California
Flora of Nevada
Flora of Utah
Flora of the Klamath Mountains
Flora of the Sierra Nevada (United States)
Natural history of the California chaparral and woodlands
Natural history of the California Coast Ranges
Natural history of the San Francisco Bay Area
Flora without expected TNC conservation status